The California whipsnake (Masticophis lateralis), also known as the striped racer, is a colubrid snake found in habitats of the coast, desert, and foothills of California.

Description
It is slender, with a yellowish stripe along each side, set against a dark brown or black back.

Diet
The California whipsnake is known to eat a variety of live animals including insects, lizards, snakes, birds, and small mammals.  It shows a strong preference for lizards, which are captured by a grasp of the mouth, and swallowed alive.

Behavior
Masticophis lateralis is fast-moving, diurnal, and an active forager. It commonly moves over and through brush and trees to avoid predation and to capture prey. The California whipsnake has been observed moving into the top of scrub plants after emerging from nightly retreats to gain access to direct sunlight before the sunlight reaches ground level. It is not venomous, but likely to strike if captured.

Taxonomy
As with many species and subspecies, taxonomic reclassification is an ongoing process, and differing sources often disagree.  The genus Masticophis may soon be absorbed by the closely related genus Coluber, which contains the racer (Coluber constrictor).

Subspecies
Masticophis lateralis has two subspecies:
M. l. lateralis  — chaparral whipsnake
The chaparral whipsnake is a common subspecies in California and northern Baja California, Mexico.  The subspecies is often associated with broken (variable) habitat types that range from northwestern to extreme southern California and further south into Northwestern Mexico.
M. l. euryxanthus  — Alameda whipsnake
The Alameda whipsnake subspecies is endemic to California.  The subspecies is considered threatened there.  Its range is relatively small, and much of the subspecies' habitat is threatened by development.  It was first collected by Archie Mossman and later described by Riemer in 1954. The Alameda Whipsnake is a threatened species of colubrid snake distinguishable by its broad head, large eyes, black and orange coloring with a yellow stripe down each side, and a slender neck. The Alameda Whipsnake is a wary creature known for its speed and climbing abilities utilized when escaping predators or hunting prey.

Nota bene: A trinomial authority in parentheses indicates that the subspecies was originally described in a genus other than Masticophis.

Habitat and geographic range

The geographic range of the Alameda whipsnake subspecies is contiguous in the area of southern Alameda County, northern Santa Clara County, and western San Joaquin County, in the southeastern Bay Area of Northern California.  It has commonly been reported as having a more specific association with chaparral and scrub plant communities as the habitat where it is most commonly found.

The geographic range of the chaparral whipsnake subspecies has been reported to include woodlands, grasslands, chaparral scrublands, and riparian habitats.

References

External links
USGS Western Ecological Research Center — Masticophis lateralis 
 
The Nature Conservancy: Masticophis lateralis
United States Fish and Wildlife Service (USFWS): Masticophis lateralis euryxanthus species Account — (Alameda Whipsnake).
CaliforniaHerps.com: Masticophis lateralis euryxanthus — Alameda Striped Racer (Alameda whipsnake) 
CaliforniaHerps.com:  Masticophis lateralis lateralis — California Striped Racer (Chaparral whipsnake)

Further reading
Hallowell E (1853). "On some New Reptiles from California". Proc. Acad. Nat. Sci. Philadelphia 6: 236–238. (Leptophis lateralis, new species, p. 237).
Riemer, William J. (1954). "A new subspecies of the snake Masticophis lateralis ". Copeia 1954 (1): 45–48. (Masticophis lateralis euryxanthus, new subspecies).
Schmidt, Karl P.; Davis, D. Dwight (1941). Field Book of Snakes of the United States and Canada. New York: G.P. Putnam's Sons. 365 pp., 34 plates, 103 figures. (Coluber lateralis, pp. 127–129, Figure 30 + Plate 14).
Smith, Hobart M.; Brodie, Edmund D., Jr. (1982). Reptiles of North America: A Guide to Field Identification. New York: Golden Press. 240 pp.  (paperback),  (hardcover). (Masticophis lateralis, pp. 190–191).
Wright, Albert Hazen; Wright, Anna Allen (1957). Handbook of Snakes of the United States and Canada. Ithaca and London: Comstock Publishing Associates, a division of Cornell University Press. 1,105 pp. (in two volumes). (Masticophis lateralis, pp. 449–453, Figure 134 + Map 36 on p. 424).

Colubrids
Reptiles of the United States
Reptiles of Mexico
Fauna of the California chaparral and woodlands
Fauna of the Baja California Peninsula
Natural history of Alameda County, California
Natural history of Santa Clara County, California
Natural history of San Joaquin County, California
Least concern biota of North America
Reptiles described in 1853